Events in the year 1990 in Burkina Faso.

Incumbents 

 President: Blaise Compaoré

Events 

 President Blaise Compaoré presents minor democratic reforms in response to an alleged coup during the previous year.

Deaths

References 

 
1990s in Burkina Faso
Years of the 20th century in Burkina Faso
Burkina Faso
Burkina Faso